Tenellus trimaculatus is a species of thorny catfish native to Brazil, Colombia, Ecuador, Guyana, Peru and Venezuela.  This species grows to a length of  SL.

References 

Doradidae
Freshwater fish of Brazil
Freshwater fish of Colombia
Freshwater fish of Ecuador
Freshwater fish of Peru
Fish of the Amazon basin
Fish described in 1898
Taxa named by George Albert Boulenger